The Whitley Awards have been awarded annually since 1979 by the Royal Zoological Society of New South Wales (RZSNSW).  They commemorate Gilbert Whitley, an eminent Australian ichthyologist, and are presented for outstanding publications, either printed or electronic, that contain new information about the fauna of the Australasian region.

For a publication to receive a Whitley Award it must either make a significant contribution of new information, present a new synthesis of existing information, or present existing information in a more acceptable form.  All texts must contain a significant proportion of information that relates directly to Australasian zoology.  Moreover, all submissions must have been published within 18 months of the awards entry date.

A presentation ceremony is held each year in September at the Australian Museum in Sydney when the authors and publishers of the winning titles receive their awards.

Awards
Certificates of Commendation may be awarded to publications judged as the best in various categories including, but not limited to, illustrated publications, textbooks, field guides, reference works, historical zoology, periodicals, handbooks, children’s publications, CD-ROMs, limited editions and videos.

Whitley Medal

The Whitley Medal may be awarded to a publication deemed to be of superior quality that makes a landmark contribution to the understanding, content or dissemination of zoological knowledge.  The Whitley Medal is the top award in zoological publishing in Australia and is not necessarily awarded every year, though sometimes more than one medal may be awarded.

See also
 Whitley Awards (UK)
 List of biology awards

References

External links
 About the Whitley Award
 List of past winners

Biology awards
Australian literary awards
Australian non-fiction book awards